Jennifer Herd is an Australian Indigenous artist with family ties to the Mbar-barrum people of North Queensland. She is a founding member of the ProppaNOW artist collective, and taught at the Queensland College of Art in Brisbane, where she convened both the Bachelor of Fine Art and Contemporary Australian Indigenous Art. In 2003 she won the Queensland College of Art Graduate Students prize, the Theiss Art Prize, for her Masters of Visual Arts.

Education and teaching 
Herd received a Certificate in Fashion Design from Queensland College of Art, and worked in fashion and theater for twelve years.  She then completed her Diploma of Teaching (Early Childhood Education) from Queensland University of Technology, followed by a Master of Visual Arts from Queensland College of Art. She taught at Queensland College of Art from 1993 until her retirement in 2014.

Style and themes 
Herd's artwork frequently explores themes related to Indigenous experience, tradition, and assimilation, based in her experience as an Indigenous woman born "out of country." Shields, an important part of North Queensland culture, are a frequent recurrent in her work, standing in for strength and protection, and drawing on the traditional practice of decoration performed by women for warriors.

ProppaNOW 
In 2003 Herd co-founded ProppaNOW, a collective designed to "give urban-based Aboriginal artists a voice." ProppaNOW's aim has been to work collectively to create new and better opportunities for Indigenous artists working in urban environments.

Exhibitions and awards

Exhibitions 

 2015 GOMA Q: Contemporary Queensland Art Gallery of Modern Art Brisbane
 2012  proppaNOW exhibition Fehily Contemporary Collingwood Melbourne
 2012  proppaNOW  exhibition Kural Dargun  Indigenous Knowledge Centre State Library of Queensland
 2011 Shared Vision QCA Poland Travelling Exhibition  Poland
 2011  Australia Felix  Philadelphia, United States, America
 2011  Black See Cairns Indigenous Art Fair KickArts Cairns
 2011 Flash Women  Kural Dargun Indigenous Knowledge Centre State Library of Queensland
 2011 proppaNOW  New & Recent WorksShow  Canberra Art Space, ACT
 2011 The Tower of Babel Project Woodford Folk Festival contributing artist Woodford
 2010  Southbank Board Walk Project Griffith University and Southbank Corp
 2010  Just Drawn Linden Gallery Fitzroy Melbourne Victoria
 2010 Putsch  Adelaide Festival contributing artist  proppaNOW Tandanya Exhibition Adelaide
 2009-2010 Woodford Folk Festival Canoe Project contributing artist Woodford
 2010 proppaNOW Women’s Business  Sydney College of Art
 2007  Friendly Fire GPG  George Petelin Gallery Southport
 2007 Thresh Holds of Tolerance  Canberra School of Arts Australian National University
 2006  Colonial to Contemporary QCA, 125 years Galleria Queensland College of Art South Brisbane
 2006  There Goes the Neighbourhood  proppaNOW Studios West End
 2005  San Francisco Bayiennally’ San Francisco California USA
 2005  Thick and Fast proppaNOW Group Show Powerhouse  QLD
 2005  proppaNOW Launch Show  ProppaNOW Studios West End Brisbane
 2005  Q Pacifica Project Gallery QCA Griffith University Brisbane
 2005 Dreaming Festival ProppaNOW Lane Gallery Auckland New Zealand
 2005  ProppaNOW  Brisbane Convention Centre Brisbane

Selected awards 

 2017 Sunshine Coast Art Prize (Highly Commended Award) Caloundra Regional Gallery
 2016 33rd National Aboriginal and Torres Strait Islander Art Awards (Finalist) Museum and Art Gallery Northern Territory
 2003 Theiss Prize (winner) QCA Gallery Griffith University Southbank

Career and Influences 
In 2021 Jennifer Herd was interviewed in a digital story and oral history for the State Library of Queensland's James C Sourris AM Collection. In the interview Herd talks to artist and academic, Pat Hoffie about her life, her art and her inspirations.

References

External Links 

 Jennifer Herd digital stories and oral history. John Oxley Library, State Library of Queensland, 22 March 2021, 6min, 30min and 1hour version available to view online.
 Portrait of an Artist: Jennifer Herd.. In this Portrait of an artist event, Associate Professor and artist Pat Hoffie, AM and Director, Fireworks Gallery Michael Eather sit down in conversation with Mbarbarrum artist Jennifer Herd.

Year of birth missing (living people)
Living people
Australian Aboriginal artists
Queensland College of Art alumni
Queensland University of Technology alumni
Australian women artists